Elsie Werner was an American screenwriter of silent films; she was active in Hollywood in the 1920s.

Selected filmography 

 Making the Varsity (1928)
 Into No Man's Land (1928)
 A Bit of Heaven (1928)
 The Shadow on the Wall (1925)

References 

American women screenwriters
Silent film screenwriters
Year of birth missing
Year of death missing